Frank Welch (February 10, 1835 – September 4, 1878) was a Nebraska Republican politician.

He was born at Bunker Hill, Charlestown, Massachusetts on February 10, 1835 and moved to Boston in with his parents. He graduated from Boston High School and took up civil engineering. He moved to the Nebraska Territory in 1857 to Decatur, Nebraska serving as postmaster.

He served in the Nebraska Territorial council in 1864 and was presiding officer of the Territorial House of Representatives in 1865, also serving in the house in 1866. He was a register of the land office at West Point, Nebraska from 1871 to 1876. He was elected as a Republican to the Forty-fifth United States Congress serving from March 4, 1877 until his death in Neligh, Nebraska on September 4, 1878. He is interred in Forest Hills Cemetery, Jamaica Plain, Massachusetts.

See also
List of United States Congress members who died in office (1790–1899)

References

External links
  at the Nebraska State Historical Society. Retrieved on 2009-10-27.

1835 births
1878 deaths
People from Charlestown, Boston
People from Decatur, Nebraska
People from West Point, Nebraska
Members of the Nebraska Territorial Legislature
Republican Party members of the United States House of Representatives from Nebraska
19th-century American politicians
American postmasters